Kent Fearns (born September 13, 1972) is a Canadian former professional ice hockey defenseman who was an All-American for Colorado College

Career
Fearns joined the ice hockey program at Colorado College in 1991 after helping the Chilliwack Chiefs win a regular season title. He was nearly a point per game player for the Tigers and named to the WCHA all-Rookie team. Fearns helped CC post its first non-losing season since 1980 and its first postseason game in five years. The team's success couldn't be sustained, however, and the Tigers finished last in the conference in 1993. Don Lucia was brought in as head coach for Fearns' junior season and the change in leadership brought about an incredible turnaround. CC won its first regular season title in 37 years and posted the best record since winning the national championship in 1957. The renaissance for the program continued the following year and Fearns helped CC win back-to-back conference titles for the first time in program history. He was named an All-American as CC won 30 games for the first time and reached the NCAA Tournament for the first time since 1978.

With his college career over, Fearns signed a professional contract the following year and slowly worked his way up to the top level of the minor leagues. After more than two years with the Manitoba Moose and no callups to the NHL on the horizon, Fearns headed to Europe. His first year with the Munich Barons saw the team with the DEL championship. After finishing as runner-ups the following year, the team's finances became problematic. Fearns remained with the club until 2002 and then spent a season with ERC Ingolstadt. In 2003 he returned to his previous franchise, which had now relocated to Hamburg and then ended his playing career with EC KAC.

Statistics

Regular season and playoffs

Awards and honors

References

External links

1972 births
Living people
Ice hockey people from British Columbia
People from Langley, British Columbia (district municipality)
Canadian ice hockey defencemen
Colorado College Tigers men's ice hockey players
AHCA Division I men's ice hockey All-Americans
Cape Breton Oilers players
Knoxville Cherokees players
Flint Generals players
Las Vegas Thunder players
Manitoba Moose players
ERC Ingolstadt players
Hamburg Freezers players
EC KAC players
Hartford Whalers draft picks
National Hockey League supplemental draft picks